Justin Moyer (born 1977) is an American musician and journalist. He has been a member of many Washington, D.C.-based bands on Dischord Records, including El Guapo, Supersystem, Antelope, and E.D. Sedgwick. He writes for The Washington Post.

Bands

El Guapo/Supersystem 

Moyer formed El Guapo with Rafael Cohen, now a member of !!!, at Wesleyan University in 1996, when Moyer and Cohen were juniors. After recording for Resin, Mud Memory, Dischord, and Touch and Go Records, the band broke up in 2006.

Antelope 
Moyer formed Antelope with Bee Elvy and Mike Andre in 2001. After releasing an eponymous EP produced by Trans Am's Phil Manley as well as a single and full-length produced by Ian MacKaye, the band broke up in 2008.

SPRCSS 
In 2006, Moyer declared the defunct New Jersey group S-Process, also known as SPRCSS, his favorite band in a blog post and called for the band to reform. Partially in response to this plea, SPRCSS, which had recorded for French Kiss Records, reformed in 2007 with Moyer playing guitar. After founding drummer Daneil Mazone quit the band in 2011, the band, fronted by founding guitarist Bob Doto, played additional shows with TJ Lipple on drums, and a final show at Fort Reno Park with Moyer on drums. Later that year, the band digitally self-released two EPs produced by Moyer and Ian MacKaye.

E.D. Sedgwick 
Moyer formed Edie Sedgwick with Ryan Hicks (formerly of Bloomington, Ind.'s Panoply Academy Glee Club) in 1999. The duo, who wrote songs about celebrities, took its name from Andy Warhol superstar Edie Sedgwick. Moyer played bass; Hicks played drums. After releasing "First Reflections," an LP, on Moyer's Mud Memory Records  and recording another, the band went on hiatus in 2001 when Moyer was diagnosed with epilepsy.

In 2004, Moyer relaunched Edie Sedgwick as a solo act, performing in drag accompanied only by an iPod. He released the LP "Her Love is Real But She Is Not," a well-reviewed  electroclash effort recorded primarily in his bedroom, on Desoto Records  in 2005. "I always found it strange that every musician I met would spend so much time engrossed by visual media and then write a song about class struggle or Rwandan genocide," Moyer said in 2008. "I'm more interested in making my art about Molly Ringwald or Martin Sheen than exploring these so-called weighty topics which, for better and worse, are alien to me."

After releasing "Things Are Getting Sinister and Sinisterer," an LP, on Dischord in 2008, Moyer again reformatted the band—he no longer performs in drag, and performs exclusively with women. Subsequent tours and videos  to support 2011's LP "Love Gets Lovelier Every Day" have showcased this version of the band, now called "E.D. Sedgwick" instead of "Edie Sedgwick." "We Wear White," Sedgwick's most recent LP, was released in November 2012.

Puff Pieces 
Moyer plays guitar in Puff Pieces, a trio featuring Mike Andre of Antelope and Amanda Huron of Vertebrates. The band released a single on Lovitt Records in 2014, and a full-length in 2016.

Light Beams 
Light Beams, a trio featuring Moyer, bassist Arthur Noll and drummer Sam Lavine, released a cassette and a split seven-inch with Ian Svenonius's solo project Escapism in 2017.

Discography

Writing
Moyer, a former private investigator,  is a long-time freelancer for The Washington City Paper, where he covered the 2008 election, and blogs about books and life as a touring musician.  Since 2008, he has written for The Washington Post, where he reviews books  and writes about poker  and city politics.

In 2009, Moyer was criticized by conservative websites for a piece on Jenna Bush. His pieces about the Beatles, the Google Doodle and jazz have also generated controversy.

References

Dischord Records artists
Singers from Washington, D.C.
American indie rock musicians
American male non-fiction writers
American non-fiction writers
American punk rock singers
Living people
Wesleyan University alumni
People with epilepsy
1977 births
21st-century American singers